Princes is the plural for prince, a royal title.

Princes may also refer to:

Roads:
 Princes Highway, a major road in Australia
 Princes Motorway, New South Wales, Australia
 Princes Freeway, Victoria, Australia
 Princes Street, a major thoroughfare in central Edinburgh, Scotland
 Princes Street, Dunedin, New Zealand

Music:

 Die Prinzen, a German band whose name translate to The Princes
 The Princes (Estonian band), an Estonian rock band

Other uses:
 Princes Group, a food manufacturing company based in the United Kingdom
 Princes Bridge (disambiguation)
 Princes Ice Hockey Club, an early European ice hockey teams, sometimes considered the first ice hockey club in Britain
 Prince Alfred College, a private boys school in Kent Town, South Australia, also known as Princes
 Princes (novel) (1997), by Australian novelist Sonya Hartnett

See also
 Princes Park (disambiguation)
 Prince's Dock, Liverpool, part of the Port of Liverpool, England
 Princes Town, Trinidad
 Prince (disambiguation)